Heather Oesterle is the current head coach of Central Michigan women's basketball team. Oesterle was named CMU's head women's basketball coach in July, 2019, succeeding her long-time mentor Sue Guevara. Oesterle served for nine seasons on Guevara's staff at CMU, helping lead the program to unprecedented heights including three Mid-American Conference championships, two MAC Tournament titles, and five MAC West Division crowns. She earned her bachelor's degree in kinesiology from Michigan in 2002 and her master's degree in sports studies from Miami in 2008.

Playing career
She played four years under head coach Sue Guevara at Michigan from 1998 to 2002.

Michigan statistics

Source

Coaching career
Early in her coaching career she was an assistant at Stanford before coming to the MAC as assistant at Miami (OH) and Northern Illinois. She joined Guevara's staff at Central Michigan in 2012 where she remained until Guevara's retirement.

Central Michigan
On July 12, 2019, Oesterle was announced as the new head coach of the Central Michigan women's basketball program. In her first season the Chippewas won the regular season championship with a 15–1 MAC record. They were upset in the MAC tournament prior to its cancellation due to the COVID-19 pandemic and their hopes in the postseason were dashed by the cancellation of the NCAA tournament In 2021 her team won the MAC tournament with a 77–72 win over Bowling Green. They lost to Iowa in the first round of the NCAA tournament.

Head coaching record

College

References

External links
Central Michigan Chippewas coaching bio

Living people
1979 births
American women's basketball coaches
American women's basketball players
Basketball coaches from Michigan
Basketball players from Michigan
People from Mason, Michigan
Penn State Lady Lions basketball coaches
Northern Illinois Huskies women's basketball coaches
Michigan Wolverines women's basketball players
Central Michigan Chippewas women's basketball coaches
Miami RedHawks women's basketball coaches